The Terminator, also known as a Cyberdyne Systems Model 101 or the T-800, is the name of several film characters from the Terminator franchise portrayed by Arnold Schwarzenegger and numerous actor stand-ins digitally overlaid with Schwarzenegger's likeness. The Terminator himself is part of a series of machines created by Skynet for infiltration-based surveillance and assassination missions, and while an android for his appearance, he is usually described as a cyborg consisting of living tissue over a robotic endoskeleton.

The first appearance of the Terminator was as the eponymous antagonist in The Terminator, a 1984 film directed and co-written by James Cameron. While the original Terminator was destroyed, other machines with the same appearance are featured in the sequels. In Terminator 2: Judgment Day and Terminator 3: Rise of the Machines, Schwarzenegger's Terminator serves as the main protagonist, while in Terminator Genisys and Terminator: Dark Fate, he serves as a supporting protagonist, and is pitted against other Terminators sent by Skynet and its successor Legion. In Terminator Salvation and Dark Fate, the character also appears briefly as an antagonist. In the context of the stories, the plot device of having various robots looking the same provides a certain continuity for the human characters by exploiting their emotional familiarity with a particular "human" visage associated with each "model". The "Terminator" title is also used as a generic name for other human-simulating characters in the Terminator franchise, such as the liquid-metal T-1000 antagonist in Judgment Day.

Character nomenclature
Commonly known as the Terminator, the character is also given more specific designations, which help distinguish it from other mass-produced Terminators seen in each of the sequels. The end credits of the first three Terminator films list Arnold Schwarzenegger's characters as simply "Terminator", while in Terminator Genisys, he is credited as "Guardian". In Terminator Salvation, the character is credited and referred to as "T-800", while in Terminator: Dark Fate, the character is credited as "T-800 / Carl".

In the first two films and Dark Fate, the character is referred to as "Cyberdyne Systems Model 101". In Terminator 3: Rise of the Machines (T3), it is referred to as a "T-101". This name also occurs throughout the T2 novels. The name "T101" was used as early as 1991, in the Amstrad CPC and ZX Spectrum versions of the Terminator 2 computer game. In the T2 Extreme Edition DVD, and the Terminator 2 video game, he is referred to as an 800 series and a T-800. Trailers and a deleted scene of Terminator 2: Judgment Day identify the Terminator specifically as a "Cyberdyne Systems Series 800 Model 101". The T3 DVD extras refer to him as an "850 series Model 101", a "T-850", and a "T-101". The novelization of the third film also refers to the character as T-850, described as a newer, upgraded version of the T-800. Terminator Salvation has the first on-screen usage of the term T-800, a name that is also used in Terminator Genisys. Additionally, in an early scene in Terminator Genisys, an automated voice at Skynet's facility refers to a younger version of the character as a "Model 101".

Most of the merchandising for T2 and T3—both at the time of their releases and retroactively—used the T-800 and T-850 nomenclature, contributing to this designation having arguably the most popular and widely disseminated usage, especially in direct juxtaposition to the explicitly named T-600s and T-1000. Such merchandise included Action Masters miniatures, Cinemaquette statues, Sideshow Collectibles replicas, Hollywood Collectibles statuettes, ArtFX kits, Medicom figures, and products by Hot Toys, and McFarlane Toys.

The specific Terminator characters portrayed by Schwarzenegger are also called on-screen by several individual names or nicknames. In Terminator 2: Judgment Day, John Connor introduces the Model 101 to his mother's friends as his "Uncle Bob". In Terminator Genisys, Sarah Connor refers to the T-800 as "Pops". In Terminator: Dark Fate, the character goes by the name "Carl".

Physical appearance
In the T2 commentary, Cameron states that the Model 101s all look like Schwarzenegger, with a 102 looking like someone else, leading to speculation that the 101 refers to the physical appearance while the 800 refers to the endoskeleton common to many models. A scene deleted from the theatrical cut, but restored in the Terminator 2 Special Edition, lends the most credence to this explanation: John and Sarah Connor shut down the Terminator for modification according to his instructions. When he reboots, the upper-left of his HUD reads "Cyberdyne Systems Series 800 Model 101 Version 2.4". Additionally, the original Terminator 2 teaser trailer further verifies this on a display monitor during android tissue generation, referencing "Series 800 Model 101". In the T2 novel T2: Infiltrator, a skinless T-800 is known as a T-90, while a T-800 with Schwarzenegger's likeness is stated to be part of the T-101 series, specifically a T-101A.

Appearances

A Cyberdyne Systems Model 101 Terminator with living tissue over a metal endoskeleton, played by Schwarzenegger, is the main antagonist of The Terminator, the original Terminator film. Another Model 101, having been reprogrammed by the human resistance in the future, is the protagonist of Terminator 2: Judgment Day. In Terminator 3: Rise of the Machines, Schwarzenegger plays a Terminator known as T-101. His character is destroyed at the end of each of these films.

The fourth installment, Terminator Salvation, reveals the origin of the character. Roland Kickinger was cast as the principal actor but CGI was used to superimpose Schwarzenegger's face from the original 1984 film. In the fifth installment, Terminator Genisys, Schwarzenegger plays an aging T-800 (reprogrammed by an unknown party) and becomes a mentor and father figure to a young Sarah Connor of an alternate timeline, and Brett Azar portrays the original Terminator from the first film, with Schwarzenegger's then-likeness utilized via CGI. In the sixth film, Terminator: Dark Fate, Schwarzenegger once more plays an aging T-800 that managed to kill John Connor three years after the events of Judgment Day. Due to Skynet's cessation, the T-800 appears to have gained self-awareness and integrated itself into human society, adopting the name "Carl" and developing the equivalent of a remorseful conscience upon discovering how John's death affected Sarah Connor. Azar also returns to his role, portraying Carl at physical prime in the opening sequence (again with Schwarzenegger's then-likeness utilized).

The character's catchphrase, used throughout the franchise, is "I'll be back", though at times with variations; in Terminator 3, it says about the T-X, "She'll be back", and later, "I'm back"; and in Terminator: Dark Fate, it tells its family, "I won't be back". Throughout the films, other characters use the phrase, such as John Connor in Salvation (as Schwarzenegger does not appear in the film) and Sarah Connor in Dark Fate.

The Terminator (1984) 

The Model 101 is sent back in time to terminate a single target, Sarah Connor (Linda Hamilton), in 1984, to prevent the birth of her son, John, the future leader of the Human Resistance. Lack of surviving records in the future meant that he was limited to only knowing Sarah's name and that she lived in Los Angeles at the time, with the result that he killed two other Sarah Connors in the same city before he found his target. This allowed Kyle Reese (Michael Biehn), a soldier sent from the future to protect Sarah, to find her before the Terminator does. During several skirmishes the Terminator withstands contemporary gunfire with only superficial damage to his exterior tissue.  While he is later caught in a fuel tanker explosion, this only burns away the flesh covering to expose his mechanical nature and causes minor damage to one of his legs, slowing him down. After Kyle sacrifices himself to damage the Terminator with a pipe bomb that destroys his legs, Sarah crushes the remaining endoskeleton in a hydraulic press to shut him down permanently.

Terminator 2: Judgment Day (1991) 

A Model 101 is reprogrammed by the future John Connor (Michael Edwards), and sent back to 1995 to protect young John (Edward Furlong) from a T-1000 (Robert Patrick) dispatched to kill him. While interacting with the Connors as they work to prevent Judgment Day (a scene from the extended version of the film shows the Connors explicitly reprogramming the Terminator to be capable of learning rather than Skynet's default "read-only" programming), this Model 101 is taught how to speak in slang-like terms, such as "Hasta la vista, baby", and encouraged to act more human, to the point that it develops into an almost fatherly role for John. Sarah reflects that the Model 101 is the first male figure John has ever had in his life who can be guaranteed to always be there for him. The T-1000 chases Sarah, John, and the Model 101 into a steel mill and overpowers the latter in hand-to-hand combat, impaling it through the chest and destroying its main power supply. However, the Model 101 activates a backup power source, frees itself, and blasts the T-1000 into a vat of molten steel with a grenade launcher to destroy it.

Leading up to these events in the second film, Cyberdyne recovers one forearm and the damaged CPU chip from the Terminator in 1984 and uses those components to radically advance its research and technology, leading eventually to the creation of the machine intelligence entity Skynet. In Terminator 2, John steals the items from Cyberdyne's research lab and later throws them into the vat to destroy them. Because it cannot self-terminate, the Model 101 has Sarah lower it into the steel in order to destroy its CPU as well and thus prevent its technology from being used to create Skynet.

Terminator 3: Rise of the Machines (2003) 

In the third film, a T-101 Terminator portrayed by Schwarzenegger is reprogrammed to protect John Connor (Nick Stahl), as well as his future wife Kate Brewster (Claire Danes), from a T-X (Kristanna Loken). The T-X is also designed to destroy other Terminators. The T-101 is powered by two hydrogen fuel cells, one of which it discards after being damaged by the T-X. This Terminator, unlike the others, is more familiar with human behaviors. The T-101 tells John that his efforts in the second film did not stop Judgment Day, but merely delayed it. Eventually, the T-X uses its nanites to take control of the T-101's autonomous functions, sending it to kill John and Kate. Since the T-101's core consciousness is still intact and it just lacks physical control of its body, John is able to incites the T-101 to shut down by reminding it of the conflict between its current actions and its programmed mission to ensure his and Kate's survival. The T-101 later reboots itself free from the T-X's control. As John and Kate retreat to a bunker to wait out the now-inevitable nuclear war, the Terminator is destroyed when it jams its remaining hydrogen fuel cell into the T-X's mouth, resulting in a massive detonation that destroys them both.

This T-101 also is revealed to have played a very important role in John's previous future: it is the one that kills John in 2032 after being chosen due to John's emotional attachment to its model, based on the events of Terminator 2. Despite this, John remains trusting it. Later, the Terminator is captured, reprogrammed and sent to the past to make sure that young-adult John and Kate would survive the start of the war. As a result of John's death in the future, it follows Kate's orders rather than John's, unlike the Terminator in the second film.

Terminator Salvation (2009) 

In the fourth film, the T-800 has a small role, though once again as an antagonist. It engages John Connor (Christian Bale) in battle during John's attempt to rescue Kyle Reese (Anton Yelchin) from the Skynet base in San Francisco. John holds his own with his advanced weaponry, but is unable to stop the Terminator until it is drenched in molten metal and then liquid nitrogen, freezing it temporarily. As John begins planting hydrogen fuel cells, cyborg prototype Marcus Wright (Sam Worthington) arrives to stall the T-800, able to match its strength due to his own metal endoskeleton, but due to Marcus harbouring biological organs, specifically his human heart, the T-800 is able to incapacitate him long enough to stab John through the abdomen from behind, wounding him. Marcus retaliates by jamming the same metal bar through the T-800's neck and twisting it until its head rips off, destroying it instantly. The hydrogen fuel cells are set off as John and Marcus escape, destroying the base and a number of unfinished T-800s with it.

Terminator Genisys (2015)

In Terminator Genisys, a T-800 was reprogrammed by an unknown party from a point in time further in the future, and sent to 1973 to protect nine-year-old Sarah Connor (Emilia Clarke) from a T-1000 sent to kill her and her parents. After her parents are killed, the T-800 becomes her surrogate father and raises her to prepare for her future destiny, similar to the relationship between its doppelgänger and the young John Connor in Terminator 2: Judgment Day. The T-800, which Sarah refers to as "Pops", has experienced an unprecedented level of emotional development, to the extent that it keeps her childhood drawings and photographs. In the film, it is speculated that the knowledge of who sent Pops back was deliberately erased from its memory so that Skynet (Matt Smith) could not track them down later. Pops integrates into human society, and at one point obtains a job as a construction worker to build the headquarters for Cyberdyne Systems. Throughout the film, it struggles with its physical limitations due to its increasing age, but it states several times that it is "Old, not obsolete." Like the Terminator in the second film, Pops has been prohibited from killing, but as Sarah says "Pops doesn't kill anyone.  Lot of leg wounds though."

After Kyle Reese's (Jai Courtney) arrival in 1984, the trio defeat the T-1000 (Lee Byung-hun) together. Later, in 2017, they battle John Connor (Jason Clarke), who has been transformed into a T-3000 tasked to ensure Skynet's rise. After multiple confrontations, Pops attempts to sacrifice itself to destroy the T-3000, telling Kyle Reese to "protect [his] Sarah". However, during the battle, Pops is thrown into a vat of mimetic polyalloy before the T-3000's defeat, and as a result gains shapeshifting abilities similar to the T-1000, as well as repairing earlier damage such as its lost left arm. Pops gives its approval of Sarah and Kyle's relationship.

A youthful T-800 (Brett Azar), looking like the one in the first film, also appears, and is intercepted by the aging T-800 and Sarah Connor after it arrives in the alternate 1984. Despite Sarah killing the younger cyborg with her high-caliber sniper rifle, the T-1000 reactivates and reprograms it to pursue Kyle Reese. Kyle ultimately retrieves Sarah's sniper rifle and blows the young T-800's head off. The young Terminator's endoskeleton is dissolved in hydrochloric acid and its CPU is used to operate Sarah and the older Terminator's time machine. The CPU is destroyed after the time machine's usage. With both the original T-800 and the T-1000's remains destroyed in 1984 and the older Terminator's existence concealed, Cyberdyne Systems lacks the Skynet technology to work with for decades until John Connor is under Miles Dyson's (Courtney B. Vance) employ and assists his son Danny Dyson (Dayo Okeniyi) in the development of the company's Genisys technology.

Terminator: Dark Fate (2019) 

In Terminator: Dark Fate, an alternate sequel to Judgment Day, Schwarzenegger plays a T-800 called "Carl". Originally one of a series of Terminators sent back by Skynet to kill John Connor prior to its erasure, the Terminator that would become Carl successfully tracked down and killed John Connor in Livingston, Guatemala in 1998, in which it received an identifiable scar on the right side of its face from Sarah during the shootout between them. With its mission complete with no further orders, and with Skynet no longer existing, the T-800 is left purposeless. In time, however, it became self-aware, realized that it is free from Skynet, assumed the name 'Carl', and exhibits behavioral developments much like humans'. Months after killing John, it experienced compassion to an abused woman, Alicia, and made a choice of rescuing her and her child, Mateo, from her uncaring husband. Carl becomes a father figure to Mateo, although his relationship with Alicia is asexual, implying is emotional. Carl's role as a family man gave it some idea of what it had taken from Sarah when it murdered her son, and the memory of John's death torments Carl to the point of being repentant and hates itself of being a child killer.  At some point, Carl established a drapery business in Laredo, Texas, where the family lives in a cabin. Over twenty years, Carl has aged significantly, looking like a former bodybuilder in his 70s (as Schwarzenegger was at the time of the film's shooting), and its human social skills have also improved, even able to display humor and affection to its adoptive family.

Since John's death, Carl used its awareness of "chrono displacements" and sent Sarah text messages with the GPS coordinates of where and when various other time travelers such as Terminators would arrive. Carl's intention was to give Sarah a purpose by allowing her the chance to destroy the other Terminators, which Carl felt would give John's death some form of meaning. It also keeps tracks of Sarah's whereabouts to make sure she survives her hunts. In 2020, Sarah is put in a position to help Daniella 'Dani' Ramos escape the Rev-9, a new class of Terminator sent back in time by a Skynet-analogous A.I. called Legion from the year 2042. When Sarah confronts the Rev-9 as it attacks Dani, she also meets Grace, a cybernetically augmented soldier from the future who was sent back to protect Dani. With the aid of GPS coordinates tattooed onto Grace, and Grace hacking into her phone to decrypt and confirm the coordinates are the same, Sarah is led to Carl's home. Carl is then informed of Legion by Grace. Although Sarah hates Carl for the murder of her son, Dani convinces her that they need Carl's help to destroy the Rev-9. Sarah concedes, but she vows to destroy Carl after they stop the Rev-9, and Carl says it understands her intention. Carl's efforts on atonement earned Dani and Grace's respect, and Dani offers her friendship to it. After a confrontation in a hydro-electric dam, the Rev-9 is defeated at the cost of Grace and the T-800's lives, Grace sacrificing her power source to use as an EMP against the Rev-9, with Carl giving its own life to set it off. Its last words are "For John" - a message it always included in the texts it sent to Sarah, finally made amends and departed peacefully.

Other appearances 

The T-800 is a guest playable character in the 2019 fighting game Mortal Kombat 11. The character is available through the game's Kombat Pack bundle of downloadable content. Schwarzenegger's likeness is used for the character, but his voice is not. He is instead voiced by Chris Cox at the suggestion of Schwarzenegger. According to its biography, the Terminator in this game hails from the Dark Fate timeline. In its arcade ending, the Terminator uses a device called the Hourglass to rewrite its timeline's history and attempt to destroy humanity on its Earth, but fails. Instead, it creates a future preserving peace between humans and machines before going into the bottomless Sea of Blood to make sure the Hourglass never falls into the wrong hands.

In 2021, the T-800 became a character outfit in the online game Fortnite.

The T-800, alongside the T-1000, are featured in Call of Duty: Vanguard as playable operators.

The Terminator is parodied in the side-scrolling shooter game Broforce as a playable character called the Brominator, with his appearance referencing Arnold Schwarzenegger, who has the most characters based on him, alongside Brommando and Bronan the Brobarian. As a playable character, he fights with a minigun that can propel him left or right due to its recoil. His special skill is making himself invincible by becoming the T-800. In the PC version of the game, if you die as him while in T-800 form, you get an achievement called “I’ll Be Back”, a reference to the iconic line popular from Terminator.

The Terminator is referenced in Yo-Kai Watch 3, where a special sidequest is obtained in getting an item called the Studio Pass, which was obtained by an event related to the release of Terminator Genisys in the Japanese version of the game, but it wasn’t needed in the international release of the game. In the quest, which is only accessible by playing as Nate, the player meets a completely blank cat Yo-Kai called Greynyan, who needs help to get stronger, so the player teams up with Robonyan F to find three essentials to make him stronger, being a leather jacket, sunglasses and a motorbike, and then a day later, Robonyan F trains Greynyan to become the Terminyanator, and now he started talking and behaving similar to Arnold Schwarzenegger’s portrayal, and through completing the quest, the player can fight him once a day and attempt to befriend him. He’s an A Rank of the Tough Tribe, and likes Chocobars, like most cat Yo-Kai.

Concept and characteristics
The Terminator is a formidable robotic assassin and soldier, designed by the military supercomputer Skynet for infiltration and combat duty, towards the ultimate goal of exterminating the Human Resistance. It can speak naturally, copy the voices of others, read human handwriting, and even genuinely sweat, smell, and bleed. However, it has no human emotions such as pity or fear unless learned through human contact and never stops until it fulfills its mission or is destroyed or shut down (although it appears to be able to sense moments of urgency or danger, as it is depicted as raising its voice or widening its eyes in shock on several said occasions). Later Terminators are outwardly indistinguishable from humans, but dogs become agitated and bark loudly in their presence; as a result, the human resistance uses the animals to detect Terminators. In the first film, Kyle Reese explains that the T-800 was designed to be an improvement over the earlier T-600 units, which could be easily detected because their skin was made of rubber and not organic tissue. Later models, such as the Guardian from Terminator Genisys or Carl from Terminator: Dark Fate, showed a greater capacity for emotion and physical aging.
 
The most notable science fiction characteristics are that of an expert system featuring strong AI functionality combined with machine learning, and the system can interpret arbitrary non-formalized tasks. The other notable science fiction component is that of a power source which can last 120 years.

A trait persistent throughout the series is the faint red glow of the "eyes" when the cyborg is online (or blue in the case of the T-X), which dim to nothing when a Terminator shuts down. In all six movies, the lack of the glow has been used to show when one is out of action. The trait is so characteristic that light-up eyes are often found on Terminator merchandise, with some even replicating the dimming/reillumination effect that occurs during shut down or start up.

Construction 
A description from Kyle Reese from the film The Terminator states that:

"The Terminator is an infiltration unit, part man – part machine. Underneath it's a hyperalloy combat chassis, microprocessor-controlled, fully armored, very tough. But outside it's living human tissue. Flesh, skin, hair, blood, grown for the cyborgs."

As seen in the movies, a Terminator can withstand standard normal 20th century firearms, crash through walls with little to no damage, and survive explosions to some degree. Repeated shotgun blasts have enough force to knock it down and temporarily disable it, while heavy amounts of automatic fire are able to compromise the organic disguise layer. In Terminator Genisys, a large-caliber anti-materiel rifle proved sufficient to disable a T-800 in only one well-placed shot. In the second film, the Terminator says he can fully operate for 120 years on his power cell before it drains. In the finale to Terminator 2, his power source is damaged, and he is able to find an alternate source, described on the DVD commentary as heat sinks, harnessing the thermal energy from the hot surroundings. During both films, Terminators demonstrate the ability to continue functioning even after losing one or more limbs (both legs and one hand blown off by Kyle Reese, one arm crushed and torn off by rotating gears). In the third film, the Terminator—an 850 series rather than the 800 series depicted in the first two films—operates on two hydrogen fuel cells and discards one of them early due to damage. It explodes shortly thereafter with enough force to produce a small mushroom cloud.

The endoskeleton is actuated by a powerful network of hydraulic servomechanisms, making Terminators superhumanly strong. For instance, in the third movie, Schwarzenegger's character was able to handle firing a Browning .30 machine gun from the hip with one hand, while holding a coffin containing an alive John Connor and a heavy cache of weapons, showing no signs of the extra weight being any real concern.

Late in the first film, the Terminator is stripped of its organic elements when the tanker truck it is driving is blown up. What remains is the machine itself, in James Cameron's own words "a chrome skeleton, like death rendered in steel." In the later Terminator films, armies of endoskeleton-only Terminators are seen. They are visually identical to the one in the first film, and feature prominently in the "future war" sequences of those films.

CPU
The Terminator CPU is an artificial neural network with the ability to learn and adapt. It was also briefly referred to as a room-temperature superconductor. In Terminator 2, The Terminator states that "the more contact [it] has with humans, the more [it] learns." In the original film, it learns how to swear from the punks it encounters in the beginning of the film, and when a janitor of the building where one of the Sarah Connors he killed lived visits to ask about the odor from the room, it replies with "Fuck you, asshole", from a list of responses. In the second movie's Special Edition, it says that Skynet "presets the switch to 'read-only' when [Terminators] are sent out alone", to prevent them from "thinking too much". Sarah and John activate his learning ability, after which he becomes more curious and begins trying to understand and imitate human behavior. This leads to his use of the catchphrase "hasta la vista, baby". He ultimately "learn[s] the value of human life" as mused by Sarah in the closing narration. The Terminator apologized – something it had never done previously – when John was frantically trying to convince it not to be sacrificed. Its last words to John were "I know now why you cry, but it is something I can never do."

The Terminator shown in Genisys underwent an even greater degree of personal development after spending over a decade raising Sarah Connor after her parents were killed when she was a child, with Sarah referring to it as "Pops" and the Terminator referring to her as "my Sarah", its words reflecting a reluctance to allow harm to come to her for emotional reasons rather than just its programmed mission.

The Terminator in Dark Fate, after completing its mission of killing John Connor, was left purposeless but learned to become a part of humanity and effectively grew a conscience on its own over 20 years time. This Terminator states at one point that it can't love its human family like a human which it thought would be easier, but it is not. It is able to make a good father and husband, though it stresses the relationship is not physical and even successfully run a business. As Skynet and the timeline it came from was erased, it came to feel that it was set free to make its own choices. Its mission to aid Sarah and Grace protect Dani is one that is self-given rather than programmed, making it in many ways the most self-aware of the Terminators in the series as its actions, aside from the assassination of John Connor, are all its own.

Organic camouflage
The flesh-covering that is used on the majority of Terminator models has similar qualities to real human muscle and skin, as well as the ability to sweat, simulate breathing, and produce realistic body odor. Although Terminator flesh does contain blood, it only displays minimal bleeding when damaged and has never been shown to experience any kind of profuse bleeding even from massive lacerations, dozens of gunshot wounds, or even complete removal. In the absence of a circulatory system, the flesh uses a system of "nanobots" which maintain the skin. It is unknown what biological processes take place to sustain the flesh covering, since Terminators do not require the consumption of food. Under 2007-era analysis, this blood is shown to be similar to human blood, using a synthetic oxygen carrier rather than human red blood cells, as Terminator endoskeletons contain no bone marrow.

Terminator flesh heals by itself, and at a much faster rate than normal human tissue and has never been shown to bruise or discolor from trauma, even after several days. However, a Terminator's flesh covering can die if it sustains adequately massive damage without maintenance, at which point it takes on a waxy, corpse-like pallor and begins to decompose. In Terminator Genisys, it is also shown that a T-800's covering ages; Pops is shown as having aged over eleven years and then a further thirty-three. In Terminator: Dark Fate, the Terminator that killed John Connor visibly aged over the course of the twenty years between the assassination and when it was rediscovered by Sarah Connor, though not as much as Pops had. In addition, its skin covering aging over time allowed it to blend in undetected all that time as a human with a human family. By contrast, a T-888's undamaged flesh can remain un-aging for decades; Myron Stark immured itself for 89 years, emerging from its wall unchanged.

Although clearly not the normal procedure, a bare T-800 endoskeleton is able to grow itself a new flesh covering using 2007 technology (with the assistance of a geneticist and its own knowledge of future formulae) by submerging itself in a blood-like bath. This improvised process results in a deformed covering that has the appearance of a burn victim and lacks its own biological eyes, requiring it to steal some and subsequently undergo cosmetic surgery to produce a more normal appearance (while escaping detection from law enforcement as it was able to undergo this procedure without the use of pain medication). Whether or not this replacement flesh possessed the T-800's original flesh's un-aging properties, it appeared healthy despite the T-800's deactivation for many days. The theft of the eyes suggests that Terminator flesh is capable of accepting some degree of organ grafts from ordinary humans, that it can circumvent transplant rejection, and is capable of sustaining the life of the grafted tissue via its own unknown biological process.

Although a T-800's physical covering ages like regular human skin, it can be regrown with enough time. During a confrontation with a T-1000 in 1984, the organic covering on its right forearm is destroyed while it is holding the T-1000 under a shower of acid, and it states that its dissolved covering would take years to regrow. By the time it is seen thirty-three years later, its covering was fully regrown, and the Terminator had spent some time working in construction, implying that it had become operational in time for it to regularly interact with humans.

Physical template

It has been shown that Terminators' flesh coverings are somehow grown identically, producing many multiple copies of exactly the same physical appearance, indicating the use of specific physical templates for different variations of a model or series. The most well known is that worn by multiple units portrayed by Schwarzenegger; a scene in Terminator: The Sarah Connor Chronicles displays a memory of a T-888 model, referred to as "Vick", facing a room (presumably in the factory where he was created) of several dozen units sharing an identical template to himself, naked and moving in unison to his direction.<ref>Episode 8, "Vick's Chip", Terminator: The Sarah Connor Chronicles.</ref>

A deleted scene from Terminator 3: Rise of the Machines reveals that the T-101's appearance was based on Chief Master Sergeant William Candy, portrayed by Schwarzenegger with a dubbed-over Southern accent, which was replaced by the more menacing Austrian-accented voice of one of the developers. In a flashback sequence in The Terminator, a T-101 known as an "Infiltrator" bears the appearance of Franco Columbu. In Terminator Salvation, the T-800 is shown to be stronger physically than its predecessor, tearing a malfunctioning T-600 in half. It is also the first model to be manufactured using a titanium alloy. However, titanium loses strength when heated above 430 °C (806 °F) which later prompted Skynet's decision to use coltan, which is also referred as columbite–tantalite, for better heat resistance as its metal base as stated in Terminator: The Sarah Connor Chronicles; it is also used for the T-850 and T-888 models.

According to Terminator Salvation, the T-800 was the first Terminator to have a human styled skeleton built using coltan and titanium alloy. The earlier Terminators had a bulkier design, though the 800 series are still large enough to necessitate their usual appearance as large, heavily built men.

An entirely different origin of the Terminator's physical and vocal templates was provided in the novel T2: Infiltrator (published prior to T3), in the form of former counter-terrorist Dieter von Rossbach, who meets and joins forces with the Connors in the present (the novel reveals that he was never questioned about the Terminators' actions as his superiors always knew that he was somewhere else during its rampages). The reason stated for copying Dieter was that Skynet was looking in the old military files for someone whose body could effectively conceal the Terminator's massive endoskeleton. Its voice was provided through Kurt Viemeister, the scientist that taught Skynet its sentience. Skynet also uses Viemeister's voice.

The teaser trailer for Terminator 2: Judgment Day shows a Model 101 having its flesh covering applied by a large industrial mold.

Reception
 In a rating of 100 Heroes & Villains made by the American Film Institute the character takes two positions at once — number 48 as the hero and number 22 as the villain. Schwarzenegger himself presented this on television.
 The character holds the 14th place in Empire'' magazine's rating of 100 greatest film characters.

References

Articles about multiple fictional characters
Action film characters
Action film villains
Arnold Schwarzenegger
Film supervillains
Augmented reality in fiction
Biorobotics in fiction
Characters created by James Cameron
Film characters introduced in 1984
Fictional artificial intelligences
Fictional assassins
Fictional androids
Fictional bodyguards
Fictional characters with accelerated healing
Fictional characters with superhuman durability or invulnerability
Fictional characters with superhuman strength
Fictional characters from Los Angeles
Fictional cyborgs
Fictional mass murderers
Fictional people from the 21st-century
Fictional secret agents and spies
Fictional soldiers
Fictional suicide attacks
Fictional super soldiers
Robot superheroes
Robot supervillains
Terminator (franchise) characters
Time travelers